Andabad-e Sofla (also Romanized as Andābād-e Soflá) is a village in Qanibeyglu Rural District, Zanjanrud District, Zanjan County, Zanjan Province, Iran. At the 2006 census, its population was 831, in 216 families.

References 

Populated places in Zanjan County